The 2007 Korea National League Championship was the fourth competition of the Korea National League Championship. Cheonan FC, Jeonju EM, Asan FC and Gumi Siltron were invited to the competition.

Group stage

Group A

Group B

Group C

Group D

Knockout stage

Bracket

Quarter-finals

Semi-finals

Final

See also
2007 in South Korean football
2007 Korea National League

References

External links

Korea National League Championship seasons
National Championship